Dębniak may refer to:

Places 
Dębniak, Gmina Lubochnia, in Łódź Voivodeship
Dębniak, Gmina Ujazd, in Łódź Voivodeship
Dębniak, Zgierz County, in Łódź Voivodeship
Dębniak, Kraśnik County, in Lublin Voivodeship
Dębniak, Opole Lubelskie County, in Lublin Voivodeship
Dębniak, Masovian Voivodeship
Dębniak, Podlaskie Voivodeship
Dębniak, Świętokrzyskie Voivodeship

Other uses 
 Dębniak, a type of Polish mead; see Mead in Poland